Whiggism (in North America sometimes spelled Whigism) is a political philosophy that grew out of the Parliamentarian faction in the Wars of the Three Kingdoms (1639–1651). The Whigs' key policy positions were the supremacy of Parliament (as opposed to that of the king), tolerance of Protestant dissenters, and opposition to a "Papist" (Roman Catholic) on the throne, especially James II or one of his descendants. It is associated with early conservative liberalism.

After the huge success (from the Whig point of view) of the Glorious Revolution of 1688–1689, Whiggism dominated English and British politics until about 1760, although in practice the Whig political group splintered into different factions. After 1760, the Whigs lost power – apart from sharing it in some short-lived coalition governments – but Whiggism fashioned itself into a generalised belief system that emphasised innovation and liberty and was strongly held by about half of the leading families in England and Scotland, as well as most merchants, dissenters, and the middle classes. The opposing Tory position was held by the other great families, the Church of England, most of the landed gentry and officers of the army and the navy. Whigs also opposed Jacobitism, a movement of traditionalists tolerant of Roman Catholicism, with substantial Tory overlaps. While in power, Whigs frequently referred to all opponents as "Jacobites" or dupes of Jacobites.

Whiggism originally referred to the Whigs of the British Isles, but the name of "Old Whigs" was largely adopted by the American Patriots in the Thirteen Colonies. Following independence, American Whiggism became known as republicanism. The term "Old Whigs" was also used in Great Britain for those Whigs who opposed Robert Walpole as part of the Country Party.

Another meaning of whiggism given by the Oxford English Dictionary is "moderate or antiquated Liberalism".

Coining of "whiggism"
Quickly following the adoption of "whig" as the name of a political faction, the word "whiggism" was already in use by the 1680s. In 1682, Edmund Hickeringill published his History of Whiggism. In 1702, writing satirically in the guise of a Tory, Daniel Defoe asserted: "We can never enjoy a settled uninterrupted Union and Tranquility in this Nation, till the Spirit of Whiggisme, Faction, and Schism is melted down like the Old-Money". The name probably originates from a shortening of Whiggamore referring to the Whiggamore Raid.

Origins
The true origins of what became known as whiggism lie in the Wars of the Three Kingdoms and the power struggle between the Parliament of England and King Charles I, which eventually turned into the English Civil Wars, but only after the example of the successful use of violent opposition to the king set by the Bishops' Wars, which were fought between the same king in his capacity as king of Scotland on the one side and the Parliament of Scotland and the Church of Scotland on the other. However, the immediate origins of the Whigs and whiggism were in the Exclusion Bill crisis of 1678 to 1681, in which a "country party" battled a "court party" in an unsuccessful attempt to exclude James, Duke of York, from succeeding his brother Charles II as king of England, Scotland and Ireland. This crisis was prompted by Charles's lack of a legitimate heir, by the discovery in 1673 that James was a Roman Catholic, and by the so-called "Popish Plot" of 1678.

While a major principle of whiggism was opposition to popery, that was always much more than a mere religious preference in favour of Protestantism, although most Whigs did have such a preference. Sir Henry Capel outlined the principal motivation of the cry of "no popery" when he said in the House of Commons on 27 April 1679:

Although they were unsuccessful in preventing the accession of the Duke of York to the throne, the Whigs in alliance with William of Orange brought him down in the Glorious Revolution of 1688. By that event, a new supremacy of parliament was established, which itself was one of the principles of whiggism, much as it had been the chief principle of the Roundheads in an earlier generation.

The great Whiggish achievement was the Bill of Rights of 1689. It made Parliament, not the Crown, supreme.  It established free elections to the Commons (although they were mostly controlled by the local landlord), free speech in parliamentary debates, and claimed to give all the king's English subjects freedom from ‘cruel or unusual punishment’.

Variations

Lee Ward (2008) argues that the philosophical origins of Whiggism came in James Tyrrell's Patriarcha Non Monarcha (1681), John Locke's Two Treatises of Government (1689) and Algernon Sidney's Discourses Concerning Government (1698). All three were united in opposing Sir Robert Filmer's defence of divine right and absolute monarchy. Tyrrell propounded a moderate Whiggism which interpreted England's balanced and mixed constitution "as the product of a contextualized social compact blending elements of custom, history, and prescription with inherent natural law obligations". However, Sidney emphasised the main themes of republicanism and based Whig ideology in the sovereignty of the people by proposing a constitutional reordering that would both elevate the authority of Parliament and democratise its forms. Sidney also emphasised classical republican notions of virtue. Ward says that Locke's liberal Whiggism rested on a radically individualist theory of natural rights and limited government. Tyrrell's moderate position came to dominate Whiggism and British constitutionalism as a whole from 1688 to the 1770s. The more radical ideas of Sidney and Locke, argues Ward, became marginalised in Britain, but emerged as a dominant strand in American republicanism. The issues raised by the Americans, starting with the Stamp Act crisis of 1765, ripped Whiggism apart in a battle of parliamentary sovereignty (Tyrrell) versus popular sovereignty (Sidney and Locke).

Across the British Empire
Whiggism took different forms in England and Scotland, even though from 1707 the two nations shared a single parliament. While English whiggism had at its heart the power of parliament, creating for that purpose a constitutional monarchy and a permanently Protestant succession to the throne, Scottish Whigs gave a higher priority to using power for religious purposes, including maintaining the authority of the Church of Scotland, justifying the Protestant Reformation and emulating the Covenanters.

There were also Whigs in the North American colonies and while whiggism there had much in common with that in Great Britain, it too had its own priorities. In the unfolding of the American Revolution such whiggism became known as republicanism.

In India, Prashad (1966) argues that the profound influence of the ideas of Edmund Burke introduced Whiggism into the mainstream of Indian political thought. The Indians adopted the basic assumptions of Whiggism, especially the natural leadership of an elite, the political incapacity of the masses, the great partnership of the civil society and the best methods of achieving social progress, analysing the nature of society and the nation and depicting the character of the ideal state.

Further reading
 Carswell, John, The Old Cause: Three Biographical Studies in Whiggism (London: The Cresset Press, 1954)  deals with Thomas Wharton, George Dodington, and Charles James Fox 
 H. T. Dickinson, Walpole and the Whig Supremacy (University of London Press, 1973) 
 Dickinson, H. T. "Whiggism in the eighteenth century", in John Cannon, ed., The Whig Ascendancy: Colloquies on Hanoverian Britain (1981), pp. 28–44 
 William Herbert Dray, "J. H. Hexter, Neo-Whiggism and Early Stuart Historiography" in History and Theory, vol. 26 (1987), pp. 133–149
 Goldie, Mark, "The Roots of True Whiggism, 1688–94", in History of Political Thought 1 (1980), pp. 195–236
 Guttridge, George Herbert, English Whiggism and the American Revolution (Berkeley and Los Angeles: University of California Press, 1942) 
 Mitchell, Leslie, Whig World: 1760–1837 (2006) 
 O'Gorman, Frank, The Rise of Party in England: The Rockingham Whigs 1760–1782 (London: George Allen & Unwin Ltd, 1975) 
 Robbins, Caroline. The Eighteenth-Century Commonwealthman: Studies in the Transmission, Development, and Circumstance of English Liberal Thought from the Restoration of Charles II until the War with the Thirteen Colonies (1959, 2004). 
 Smith, Ernest Anthony, Whig principles and party politics: Earl Fitzwilliam and the Whig party, 1748–1833 (Manchester University Press, 1975) 
 Ward, Lee, The Politics of Liberty in England and Revolutionary America (Cambridge University Press, 2004) 
 Williams, Basil, and C. H. Stuart, The Whig Supremacy, 1714–1760 (Oxford History of England) (2nd ed. 1962) 
 Womersley, David, Paddy Bullard, Abigail Williams, Cultures of Whiggism: New Essays on English Literature and Culture in the Long Eighteenth Century (University of Delaware Press, 2005)

Primary sources
 Burke, Edmund, An Appeal from the New to the Old Whigs (1791)
 De Quincey, Thomas. "Dr. Samuel Parr: or, Whiggism in its relations to literature" in Works of Thomas de Quincey, vol. v, from p. 30
 Disraeli, Benjamin, ed. William Hutcheon, Whigs and Whiggism: political writings (new edition, 1971) 
 Hickeringill, Edmund, The history of Whiggism: or, The Whiggish-plots, principles, and practices (London: Printed for E. Smith, at the Elephant and Castle in Cornhill, 1682)

See also
 Whig history
 Patriot Whigs
 Radical Whigs
 Rockingham Whigs
 True Whig Party
 Whig Party (United States)
 Patriot (American Revolution)

Notes

 
Conservative liberalism
Classical liberalism
Liberalism in the United Kingdom
Political ideologies
Political philosophy
Political culture
Political history of England
Politics of the Kingdom of Great Britain